Jung-il, also spelled Jeong-il, Jong-il, or Chung-il, is a Korean masculine given name. Its meaning differs based on the hanja used to write each syllable of the name. There are 75 hanja with the reading "jung" and ten hanja with the reading "il" on the South Korean government's official list of hanja which may be registered for use in given names. One pair of hanja used to write this name also correspond to a number of different Japanese given names, including on-yomi such as Seiichi and Shōichi, kun-yomi such as Masakazu, and mixed readings such as Masaichi.

People with this name include:
Kim Jong-il (1941–2011), North Korean leader
Park Chung-il (born 1959), South Korean footballer
Lee Jung-il (born 1956), South Korean footballer
Jang Jung-il (born 1962), South Korean poet
Byun Jung-il (born 1968), South Korean boxer

See also
List of Korean given names

References

Korean masculine given names